Tell es-Safi ("White hill"; , Tel Tzafit) was an Arab Palestinian village, located on the southern banks of Wadi 'Ajjur,  northwest of Hebron which had its Arab population expelled during the 1948 Arab-Israeli war on orders of Shimon Avidan, commander of the Givati Brigade.

Archaeological excavations show that the site (a tell or archaeological mound) was continuously inhabited since the 5th millennium BCE. It appears on the Madaba Map as Saphitha, while the Crusaders called it Blanche Garde. It is mentioned by Arab geographers in the 13th and 16th centuries. Under the Ottoman Empire, it was part of the district of Gaza. In modern times, the houses were built of sun-dried brick. The villagers were Muslim and cultivated cereals and orchards.

Today the site, known as Tel Tzafit, is an Israeli national park incorporating archaeological remains which some have identified as the Philistine city of Gath, mentioned in the Bible. The remains of the Crusader fort and the Arab village can also be seen on the tell.

Names
The 6th-century Madaba Map calls it Saphitha. In the 19th century the white chalk cliff at the site was seen as the cause for the Arabic name: Tell es-Safi means "clear or bright mound". The name used in the Crusader period was Blanche Garde, the "White Fortress" in French, and Alba Specula or Alba Custodia Latin.

Geography

Tell es-Safi is situated between the Israeli cities of Ashkelon and Beit Shemesh and is one of the country's largest Bronze and Iron Age sites.

Archaeology
The site was visited in 1875 by Claude Reignier Conder who was impressed with its height and position in the landscape but not impressed by the "insolent peasants". The only visible remains were those of the Crusader era fortress.

The first excavations at the site began in 1899 when Frederick J. Bliss and R. A. Stewart Macalister worked for three seasons on behalf of the Palestine Exploration Fund. While in the early days of archaeology the methods of Bliss were reasonably advanced for those days. The excavation failed in its primary goal of firmly identifying the site as Gath but did properly work out the stratigraphy.

In the 1950 and 1960s Moshe Dayan conducted illegal digs at Tell es-Safi and other sites. Some of the robber holes can still be seen at the site today. Many of the objects from these digs ended up at the Israel Museum in Jerusalem.

Since 1996 the site has been excavated by the Tell es-Safi/Gath Archaeological Project led by Aaron Maeir.

History
Excavations at Tell es-Safi since 1996 indicate that the site was settled "virtually continuously from the Chalcolithic until the modern periods."

Bronze and Iron Ages
The site was already a significant settlement in the Early Bronze Age with an estimated area of 24 hectares. Finds from this period included a hippopotamus ivory cylinder seal, found inside a holemouth jar in a well stratified EB III (c. 2700/2600 – 2350 BC) context. The motif was that of a crouching male lion.

Stratigraphic evidence attests to settlement in the Late Bronze and Iron Age (I & II) periods. By the Late Bronze Age the site had reached an extent of 34 hectares. A find of a hieratic inscribed LBA bowl fragment (19th - 20th Dynasty) reflects the Egyptian contacts common in this region during this period. A large city in the Iron Age, the site was "enclosed on three sides by a large man-made siege-moat."

The identification was opposed by Albright, who noted its proximity to Tel Miqne (Ekron), but later excavations turned up more supportive evidence for Tell es-Safi.

Schniedewind writes that Gath was important for the Philistines in the eighth century BCE because of its easily defended geographical position. Albright argued that Tell es-Safi was too close to Tel Miqne/Ekron to be Gath. The sites are only 8 km apart. However, both Tell es-Safi and Tel Miqne were major sites in the Middle Bronze through the Iron Age. The agricultural features of this region of the southern coastal plain may be part of the explanation. Additionally, there is no certainty that the two sites flourished simultaneously. Literary sources suggest that Gath flourished in the Late Bronze and Early Iron Ages until its destruction by the Assyrians in the late eighth century B.C.E. The heyday of Ekron was the seventh century B.C.E., after the site was taken over by the Assyrians as an agricultural administrative center (Dothan and Gitin 1993).

According to 2010 reports, Israeli archaeologists uncovered a Philistine temple and evidence of a major earthquake in biblical times. Other major finds were evidence of destruction by King Hazael of Aram-Damascus around 830 BCE, and evidence of the first Philistine settlement in Canaan. Radiocarbon dating in 2015 showed an early appearance of Philistine material culture in the city.

The Tell es-Safi inscription dated to ca 1000 BCE was found at the site in 2005.

Archaeologists have also discovered a horned altar dating to the ninth century BCE. The stone altar is over 3 feet (one meter) tall, and is the earliest ever found in Philistia. The altar features a pair of horns, which is similar to the ancient Israelite altars described in the Hebrew Bible (. Nevertheless, the Israelite altars typically have four horns, such as found in Tel Be'er Sheva, for example, as opposed to two.

Byzantine period

The place appears on the Madaba Map as Saphitha.

Crusader and Ayyubid period
During the Crusades, the site was called Blanchegarde, ("White guard"), likely referring to the white rock outcrop next to the site. In 1142, a fort was built on the site by King Fulk. After the Siege of Ascalon in 1153, the castle was expanded and strengthened. It became a lordship in 1166, when it was given to Walter III Brisebarre, lord of Beirut.

It was dismantled after being taken by Saladin in 1191, but reconstructed by Richard of England in 1192. King Richard was nearly captured while inspecting his troops next to the site.

In 1253, Gilles' son Raoul (died after 1265) was documented as lord of Blanchegard. In 1265, the Baron Amalric Barlais, who was loyal to the Hohenstaufen, took over the rule of Blanchegard. Shortly thereafter Blanchegard was retaken by Muslim forces. The remnants of the square castle and its four towers served as a place of some importance in the village well into the 19th century.

Yaqut al-Hamawi, writing in the 1220s, described the place as a fort near Bayt Jibrin in the Ramleh area.

Mamluk period
The Arab geographer Mujir al-Din al-Hanbali noted around 1495 that a village by this name was within the administrative jurisdiction of Gaza.

Ottoman period

The village was incorporated into the Ottoman Empire in 1517 with all of Palestine, and in 1596 it appeared in the tax registers being in the nahiya (subdistrict) of Gaza under Gaza Sanjak, with a population of 88 Muslim households; an estimated 484 persons. The villagers paid a fixed tax rate of 25% on a number of crops, including wheat, barley and sesame, and fruits, as well as goats and beehives; a total of 13,300 akçe.

In 1838 Edward Robinson described Tell es-Safieh as a Muslim village in the Gaza district. It was "an isolated oblong hill or ridge, lying from N.to S. in the plain, the highest part being towards the South. The village lies near the middle; lower down."

The Sheikh, Muhammed Sellim, belonged to the 'Azzeh family of Bayt Jibrin. After his family took part in the Peasants' Revolt of 1834, his father and uncle were beheaded and the remaining family was ordered to take up residence at Tell es-Safi.

When Victor Guérin visited in 1863, he saw two small Muslim walīs. An Ottoman village list drawn up around 1870 counted 34 houses and a population of 165 men.

In 1883, the PEF's Survey of Western Palestine described Tell al-Safi as a village built of adobe brick with a well in the valley to the north. James Hastings notes that the village contained a sacred wely.

In 1896, the population was around 495 persons.

British Mandate
In the 1922 census of Palestine conducted by the British Mandate authorities, Tal al-Safi had a population of 644 inhabitants, all Muslims, increasing in the 1931 census to 925, still all Muslim, in a total of 208 inhabited houses.

The villagers of Tall al-Safi had a mosque, a marketplace, and a shrine for a local sage called Shaykh Mohammad. In the 1945 statistics, the total population was 1,290, all Muslims, and the land area was 27,794 dunams of land. Of this, a total of 19,716 dunums of land were used for cereals, 696 dunums were irrigated or used for orchards, while 68 dunams were classified as built-up (urban) areas.

Israel

1948 war
In 1948, Tell es-Safi was the destination for the women and children of Qastina, sent away by the menfolk of Qastina at this time, but they returned after discovering there was insufficient water in the host village to meet the newcomers' needs.

On 7 July Givati commander Shimon Avidan issued orders to the 51st Battalion to take the Tall al-Safi area and "to destroy, to kill and to expel [lehashmid, leharog, u´legaresh] refugees encamped in the area, in order to prevent enemy infiltration from the east to this important position." According to Benny Morris, the nature of the written order and, presumably, accompanying oral explanations, probably left little doubt in the battalion OC's minds that Avidan wanted the area cleared of inhabitants.

Arab village remains
In 1992, Walid Khalidi wrote that the site was overgrown with wild vegetation, mainly foxtail and thorny plants, interspersed with cactuses, date-palm and olive trees. He noted the remains of a well and the crumbling stone walls of a pool. The surrounding land was planted by Israeli farmers with citrus trees, sunflowers, and grain. A few tents belonging to Bedouin were occasionally pitched nearby.

National park
The site is now an Israeli national park and the site of ongoing archaeological excavations.

See also
Archaeology of Israel
Cities of the ancient Near East
Gath (city)
Tourism in Israel
Vassals of the Kingdom of Jerusalem
Tell (archaeology)

References

Bibliography

 

 (  p.440. )
 
 

 

 

 (pp. 51, 56, 59, 124, 189, 275) 
 

 (pp. 291–292)

 

 
 

(p.158 -p.161 )

External links
The Tell es-Safi/Gath Archaeological Project Official (and Unofficial) Weblog
Tall-al-Safi Palestine Remembered
Tall al-Safi, Zochrot
Survey of Western Palestine, Map 16: IAA,  Wikimedia commons
Tall al-Safi, at Khalil Sakakini Cultural Center

1899 archaeological discoveries
Arab villages depopulated during the 1948 Arab–Israeli War
Castles and fortifications of the Kingdom of Jerusalem
Castles in Israel
District of Hebron
Hebrew Bible cities
Philistine cities
National parks of Israel
Gath (city)